James J. Roberts (born 1947) is an American writer, journalist, radio and television news anchor, documentarian, and commentator.

Primarily a journalist, Roberts received national recognition for his reporting from wire services, fellow journalists, broadcasters associations, the American Bar Association, and cable television consortia. He is primarily known for his gripping documentaries and biting social commentary.

In addition to his work as a writer, correspondent, editor and anchorman, Roberts is known for his contributions to modern justice. He was the first Director of Communications for the Supreme Court and Judicial System of the State of Rhode Island and Providence Plantations.

At Salve Regina University in Newport, Rhode Island, he taught domestic violence victims, criminologists, police, and service providers how to better navigate legal and court systems. He championed the cause of having judges and court officials more openly communicate with the media and public and participated in the successful introduction of cameras into the state's courtrooms. At the University of Rhode Island, Roberts taught judges and the media how to develop productive, honest relationships, and he produced and anchored "Justice for ALL!", a national award winning series of hour-long programs that focused on fixing flawed laws, addressing ineffective prison rehabilitation systems, bolstering the nation's crippled courts, better addressing domestic violence, and repairing the negative impact of politics on America's justice system.

Roberts' ethics and reportorial work was strongly influenced by Edward R. Murrow. Roberts studied writing and journalism under the tutelage Louis Adler, News Director of CBS Radio News in NY and Journalism instructor at the Columbia School of Journalism; Wilbur Doctor (Providence Journal); and at the University of Rhode Island where he was graduated cum laude with a degree in Journalism.

Roberts' work has been honored by the Associated Press; by Broadcasters' Associations in Illinois, Mississippi, and Rhode Island; United Press International; the American Bar Association and others.

During his broadcast career, Roberts edited and anchored news at WNTS-All News Radio (Indianapolis, IN), WKFD (Wickford, RI), WPRI-TV (ABC-TV Providence, RI affiliate), WLKW-Radio (Providence, RI), WLOX-TV (ABC-TV Gulfcoast affiliate), WQAD-TV (ABC-TV Illinois affiliate). He also served as CBS NEWS Special Assignment Correspondent and a Special Assignment reporter for WCBS News-Radio-88 (NY). Among his better known documentary works are: Ernie Pyle: The War Years; HURRICANE!; Justice for All; Homeless in America; Radon: The Silent Killer; The Presidential Journey; and others.

Roberts, brother of classical composer David J. Sosnowski, resides in the coastal village of Wickford in North Kingstown, Rhode Island where he consults on international business development, strategic communications, crisis management, and marketing as well as publishes websites on topics of interest to him, including: RobertsReview which explores recent cancer treatment breakthroughs, Behind the Scenes the latest collection of his recent writing, MyCancerNews, which tracks new developments in treating usually fatal cancers such as pancreatic and lung cancer,  Germani! on the arts, etc.

He is managing director of Mercury, a bipartisan public strategy firm.

External links
Official website
RobertsReview
MyCancerNews.com
Roberto Germani: An American Master

References

1947 births
American male journalists
University of Rhode Island alumni
Living people
People from North Kingstown, Rhode Island